That Was The Team That Was is a Scottish television programme that documented successful time periods for Scottish football sides.  The show was broadcast on BBC One Scotland every Friday night (when there was a series ongoing) and has recently ended its third series.  Its title is derived from the 1960s BBC satire That Was The Week That Was. It was produced by Brendan O'Hara of BBC Scotland.

Format 
Filmed in a documentary style, the programme is narrated by John Gordon Sinclair and part-written by Chick Young.  It involves highlights of matches played by the featured side interspersed with recollections from former players and managers.  A scrapbook style format, showing newspaper clippings, is used to cover events for which there are no television highlights, a particular problem in 1985, when a dispute between television companies and the League led to a 6-month football broadcasting hiatus.

2006: The First Series 
The first series, entailing 6 episodes, was broadcast in February and March 2006. The date provided is that on which the episode was first aired.
 10 February – Scotland 1974: Scotland qualified for their first World Cup since 1958 but, despite remaining unbeaten, were knocked out in the first round on goal difference.
 17 February – Heart of Midlothian 1985–86: After a 31-game unbeaten run, defeat in their last two fixtures saw Hearts miss out on a League and Scottish Cup double.
 24 February – Celtic 1987–88: In their centenary year, Celtic gave their supporters fitting reason to celebrate by claiming a League and Cup double.
 3 March – Rangers 1996–97: The Gers League title victory saw them equal Celtic's cherished long-standing record of 9-in-a-row, in a season in which they also won the League Cup.
 10 March – Dundee United 1986–87: Competing on 4 fronts, Dundee United played 67 games in a season in which they reached both the UEFA Cup and Scottish Cup finals, only to lose to IFK Gothenburg and St Mirren respectively.
 17 March – Aberdeen 1982–83: Aberdeen became the third Scottish side to win a European trophy when they defeated Real Madrid 2–1 after extra time in the Cup Winners' Cup final in Gothenburg.

2007: The Second Series 
The second series, again featuring 6 episodes, was broadcast in January, February and March 2007. The date provided is that on which the episode was first aired.
 27 January – Scotland 1996: Craig Brown's side was the second Scottish team to qualify for the European Championship finals, which were held in neighbouring England in 1996.
 2 February – Hibernian 1991–92: Hibs were the subject of a hostile takeover bid by rivals Hearts' chairman Wallace Mercer in 1990. From the verge of extinction they recovered to win the League Cup against Dunfermline Athletic just over a year later.
 9 February – Celtic 1997–98: Celtic won the League for the first time since 1988 under Dutch coach Wim Jansen, in the process stopping major rivals Rangers from setting a new record of 10 League titles in a row.
 16 February – Raith Rovers 1994–95: Jimmy Nicholl's Kirkcaldy side won their first major honour by defeating Celtic in the League Cup final and also earned promotion to the Premier Division through their league form.
 23 February – Leeds United 1973–74: Don Revie's league-winning Leeds team were the first English side featured, however it contained numerous Scots, including Billy Bremner, Joe Jordan and Eddie Gray.
 2 March – Rangers 1986–87: In 1986 Graeme Souness was appointed Rangers manager and, aided by transfer spending unprecedented in Scottish football, he led the side to their first League title in 10 years.

References 

BBC Scotland television shows
Sports television in Scotland
Football mass media in Scotland
2000s Scottish television series
2000s British sports television series
2006 Scottish television series debuts
2008 Scottish television series endings